The Copperbelt University is a public university in Kitwe, Zambia. It is the second largest public university after The University of Zambia. The language of instruction at the university is English.

Overview
The Copperbelt University is a public university established through Act of Parliament No. 19 of 1987. It currently operates from five campuses: Jambo Drive Main Campus, Parklands Campus, Ndola Campus, Kapasa Makasa Campus and TAZARA Campus. The TAZARA campus is currently offering only Railway, Mechanical and Electromechanical Engineering.
These campuses are located in suburban areas in the cities of Kitwe, Ndola and Chinsali in the Copperbelt and Muchinga Provinces of Zambia.

The Copperbelt university has the biggest school of engineering in the country, offering a variety of engineering fields as bachelor's degrees with honors. It is the first institution in Southern Africa to offer mechatronics, as an achievement.

The Copperbelt University has the biggest school of built environment, offering programs such as Architecture, Real Estate, Urban and Regional Planning and Construction Economics Management (which also branches into Quantity Surveying).

The university's core business is to provide teaching, learning, research, consultancy and public service. These are carried out through its ten faculties:
School of Engineering
Bachelor's degree in Civil Engineering (Hons).
Bachelor of Science in Construction Management
Diploma in Civil Engineering
Diploma in Construction
Bachelor of Engineering (with honors) Electrical Electronics
Bachelor of Engineering (with honors) Telecommunications
Bachelor's degree in Mechanical,
Bachelor of Engineering Mechatronics
Bachelor of Engineering Aeronautical Engineering.
Bachelor of Engineering in Electromechanical Engineering
Bachelor of Engineering in Railway.
School of Mathematics and Natural Sciences
School of Natural Resources
School of Business
School of the Built Environment
Bachelor of Science in Real Estate
Bachelor of Science in Urban and Regional Planning
Bachelor of Science in Construction Economics Management
Bachelor of Arts in Architecture
School of Information and Communication Technology
Bachelor of Science in Computer Science
Diploma in Information Technology
Bachelor of Information Technology
Bachelor of Computer Engineering
Bachelor of Science in Information Systems
School of Humanities and Social Sciences
Directorate of Distance Education and Open Learning (DDEOL)
School of Medicine
School of Mines and Mineral Sciences 
bachelor of engineering in chemical engineering
Dag Hammarskjold Chair for Peace, Human Rights and Conflict Management

The Copperbelt University has about 15,900 students and produces an annual average of 1, 500 graduates who form a nucleus of experts in critical areas of national development. These include mining, banking, construction, environmental, agricultural, real estate, educational, medical, engineering and manufacturing sectors.

History
The Copperbelt University is a public university established through the Act of Parliament No. 19 of 1987. Prior to 1987, the university existed as a campus of the University of Zambia Federal System with two schools; namely: School of Business and Industrial Studies (SBIS) and School of Environmental Studies (SES). The campus was referred to as the University of Zambia at Ndola (UNZANDO) until 1 December 1987. As of 1 January 1989 the Zambia Institute of Technology (ZIT) was incorporated into the Copperbelt University to form the School of Technology. Since 1987, the university has significantly grown from only two faculties to ten by the end of 2013. The total number of students in 2017 was 11,900 and having had over 54,000 students in the past 25 years. The university too is proud of its graduates who are holding key responsibilities in various sectors of the economy within the country and beyond. At its first graduation ceremony in 1992, the university had only 100 students then graduating from the various disciplines but graduating average of 1,500 as at 2017.

In 2014, the School of Medicine received US$1 million in donation from the Council of Zambian Jewry,  of the African Jewish Congress and the World Jewish Congress.

On September 9, 2020, Mafishi, a large fish that was housed in a pond at the university died. The fish was said to bring good luck to students taking exams. President Edgar Lungu joined the nation in mourning.

Notable alumni

 Felix C Mutati, the former minister of finance, studied accountancy at CBU (UNZANDO)
 Margaret Mhango Mwanakatwe, the former Zambian Minister of Finance studied her Bachelor of Business Administration at CBU (UNZANDO).

Affiliations
Association of Commonwealth Universities; Association of African Universities; African Council for Distance Education; Southern African Regional Universities and is a signatory to the SADC Protocol on Higher Education.

References

External links 

 

 
Universities in Zambia
Kitwe
Forestry education
Buildings and structures in Copperbelt Province
Educational institutions established in 1987
1987 establishments in Zambia